Venus Plus X is a science fiction novel by American writer Theodore Sturgeon, published in 1960.<ref>[https://books.google.com/books?id=R1EppLpAdz0C&q=%22venus+plus+x%22+theodore+sturgeon%27%27The&pg=PA96 Battle of the Sexes in Science Fiction, Google Books]</ref> David Pringle included it in his book Science Fiction: The 100 Best Novels.

Plot

Charlie Johns wakes up in Ledom (model backwards), a world of gender-neutral people. He believes that he has been transported to the future, and the Ledom tell him that humanity has been destroyed by nuclear war.

He meets Seace, the head of the Science One, who explains the A-field, an invisible force field the Ledom use for everything from spoons to buildings. He meets Mielwis, the head of the Medical One, who explains to him how the Ledom came to be gender-neutral by a mutation. Mielwis tells him that the Ledom have both genital organs, which drop down when they're aroused and retract when they're not in use.

He meets Nasive and Grocid, the heads of the Children's Ones, who explain Ledom religion to him. The Ledom worship children because "it is inconceivable we would ever obey one".

Then Philos, a historian, leads him to the cerebrostyle, a technology that allows a viewer to watch recorded memories in their mind. Charlie reads a "letter" in this machine which is a manifesto of Ledom society. It tells how sexual differences have caused strife for humans and how Ledom society has achieved harmony by following a charitic religion and creating a gender-neutral culture.

After he's done reading the letter, Philos takes Charlie out to the edges of Ledom, where he finds Philos's partner Froure and his child Soutin. Philos had let the Ledom think Froure and Soutin had died in a landslide because the Ledom, despite what Mielwis had told Charlie, did not mutate but undergo monthly medical procedures to keep them gender-neutral, and Philos doesn't want this to happen to Soutin. Philos asks Charlie if he will take Soutin back to his time period, and Charlie agrees.

They go back to the Science One and after a short confrontation with Seace, Charlie takes Soutin into the time machine. However, the time machine doesn't go anywhere and Charlie realizes he's stuck in Ledom. Mielwis asks him for his opinion about Ledom, and Charlie says they're all freaks and if humanity knew they existed humans would kill every one of them.

Mielwis knocks Charlie unconscious and confers with Nasive about how humanity is not yet ready for gender equality.

Charlie is allowed to live with Philos, Froure, and Soutin at the edge of Ledom. The book ends with nuclear bombs bursting in the sky, with the Ledom and Charlie being protected by the A-field.

ReceptionVenus Plus X'' was a finalist for the 1961 Hugo Award for Best Novel. Jo Walton has described it as "clever" and "thought-provoking", and noted that it is "weirdly ahead of its time and yet could not have been written in any other (time)." Graham Sleight has observed that the novel has "problems (...) for the contemporary reader": firstly, that "the debate about men and women has moved on", and secondly, that the text "reads peculiarly as if directed at men".

References

External links

1960 American novels
1960 science fiction novels
Novels by Theodore Sturgeon
LGBT speculative fiction novels
Pyramid Books books